The Water Street Historic District is a historic district in Augusta, Kentucky, on the National Register of Historic Places.  Overlooking the Ohio  River, the district includes River Side Drive east to Frankfort Street and west to Ferry Street.  Houses in the district demonstrate a considerable range of late 18th-and early 19th-century residential architecture.

There are a  number  of Victorian  era villas  interspersed  among  the  older  houses with varied  plans  and  elevations.  The  earlier  symmetry  or  regularity  is  broken  up  with recessed  porches,  projecting  gabled  pavilions,  and  bay  windows.  Openings  are  typically  taller  and ornamented  with  hoodmolds  and  other  trim.

References

National Register of Historic Places in Bracken County, Kentucky
Historic districts on the National Register of Historic Places in Kentucky
Victorian architecture in Kentucky
Augusta, Kentucky